Comet Pojmański is a non-periodic comet discovered by Grzegorz Pojmański on January 2, 2006 and formally designated C/2006 A1. Pojmański discovered the comet at Warsaw University Astronomic Observatory using the Las Campanas Observatory in Chile as part of the All Sky Automated Survey (ASAS). Kazimieras Cernis at the Institute of Theoretical Physics and Astronomy at Vilnius, Lithuania, located it the same night and before the announcement of Pojmański's discovery,  in ultraviolet images taken a few days earlier by the SWAN instrument aboard the SOHO satellite. A pre-discovery picture was later found from December 29, 2005.

At the time of its discovery, the comet was roughly 113 million miles (181 million kilometers) from the Sun. But orbital elements indicated that on February 22, 2006, it would reach perihelion at a distance of 51.6 million miles — almost half the Earth's average distance from the Sun.
 
The comet moved on a northward path across the night sky, and reached maximum brightness around the beginning of March. Comet Pojmański reached the very fringe of naked-eye visibility at about magnitude  5, and was best visible through binoculars or a telescope. It could be found in the dawn sky within the constellation Capricornus, close to the horizon in the northern hemisphere, during late February, but viewing circumstances became better for the northern hemisphere as the comet departed southern skies and continued north. 

By early March, the comet was located in Aquila, the Eagle, and by March 7 was located in the constellation Delphinus, the Dolphin.

Comet Pojmański brightened more than initially estimated, perhaps due to over-cautious estimates by astronomers. It had previously been estimated to reach a maximum brightness of around 6.5 magnitude, but became considerably brighter.

During the comet's appearance, it sported a tail of three to seven degrees (six to fourteen times the apparent lunar diameter) and a coma of up to about 10 arcseconds.

See also

 All Sky Automated Survey
 Bohdan Paczyński

References

External links
 Space.com: "New Comet Brightens Rapidly" (Accessed 2/27/06)
 Sky and Telescope: "A Surprise Comet in the Dawn" (Accessed 2/27/06)
 Comet Data and Images from Warsaw University 
 
 

Non-periodic comets
20060102
Science and technology in Poland